Calendering of textiles is a finishing process used to smooth, coat, or thin a material. With textiles, fabric is passed between calender rollers at high temperatures and pressures. Calendering is used on fabrics such as moire to produce its watered effect and also on cambric and some types of sateens.

In preparation for calendering, the fabric is folded lengthwise with the front side, or face, inside, and stitched together along the edges. The fabric can be folded together at full width, however this is done less often as it is more difficult. The fabric is then run through rollers at high temperatures and pressure that polish the surface and make the fabric smoother and more lustrous.  Fabrics that go through the calendering process feel thin, glossy and papery.

The wash durability of a calendered finish on thermoplastic fibers like polyester is higher than on cellulose fibers such as cotton, though each depends on the amount and type of finishing additives used and the machinery and process conditions employed. Durability of blended fabrics reflects the above, and the proportion of synthetic fiber component.

Variations
Various finishes can be achieved through the calendering process by varying different aspects of the process. The main types are beetling, watered, embossing, and Schreiner.

Beetled
Beetling is a finish given to cotton and linen cloth, and makes it look like satin. In the beetling process the fabric goes over wooden rollers and is beaten with wooden hammers.

Watered
The watered finish, also known as moire, is produced by using ribbed rollers. These rollers compress the cloth and the ribs produce the characteristic watermark effect by differentially moving and compressing threads. In the process some threads are left round while others get flattened some.

Embossed
The embossing process uses  rollers with engraved patterns, which become stamped onto the fabric, which gives the fabric a raised and sunken look. This works best with soft fabrics.

Schreiner
Similar to the watered process, the Schreiner process used ribbed rollers, though very fine, with as many as six hundred ribs per inch. Pressed flat under extremely high pressure, the threads receive little lines, which causes the fabric to reflect light better than a flat surface. The high luster of cloth finished with the Schreiner method can be made more lasting by heating the rollers.

History
Historically calendering was done by hand with a huge pressing stone. For example in China huge rocks were brought from the north of the Yangtze River. The pressing stone was cut into a bowl shape, and the surface of the curved bottom made perfectly smooth. After a piece of cloth was placed underneath the stone the worker would stand on the stone and rock it with his feet to press the cloth.

See also
Mercerize

References

Textiles
Paper
Textile techniques